Gamm may refer to:

Gesellschaft für Angewandte Mathematik und Mechanik, producers of the ALGOL 58 report, often referred to as GaMM 
Rüdiger Gamm (born 1971), German 'mental calculator'